The National Trade Union Bloc (BNS) is the second largest national trade union center in Romania. It was founded in 1991 and has a membership of 375,000.

Plans for a BNS merger with CNSLR-Fratia were announced in 1994, however this has not taken place.

BNS is affiliated with the International Trade Union Confederation, and the European Trade Union Confederation.

References

External links
 BNS official site.

International Trade Union Confederation
European Trade Union Confederation
Trade unions established in 1991
1991 establishments in Romania
National trade union centers of Romania